Kosino is a station on the Nekrasovskaya line of the Moscow Metro. It was opened on 3 June 2019 as the western terminus of the inaugural stretch of the line, between Kosino and Nekrasovka. The station has a transfer to Lermontovsky Prospekt on the Tagansko-Krasnopresnenskaya line.

References

Moscow Metro stations
Railway stations in Russia opened in 2019
Nekrasovskaya line